The Gaylord was an automobile manufactured in Gaylord, Michigan by the Gaylord Motor Car Company from 1911 to 1912.  The vehicles were built in many different styles, from a convertible four-seater private car, to a utility vehicle with rear space for package or goods.  It used a four-cylinder OHV engine of 30/35 hp and was shaft driven.

The final remaining Gaylord has been fully restored, is owned by the Gaylord, Michigan, Chamber of Commerce, and is on display in the city's Visitors Center.

Gaylord Gladiator

The Gaylord Gladiator was a concept automobile designed by Matt Harbot in the 1950s, but was not produced by or related to the Gaylord Motor Car Company.

References
 

Defunct motor vehicle manufacturers of the United States
Motor vehicle manufacturers based in Michigan
Gaylord, Michigan
Defunct manufacturing companies based in Michigan